William Turpin Thayer Arteaga (born 12 October 1918−28 May 2018) was a Chilean politician who served as ministry of State during the period of Eduardo Frei Montalva to later be a collaborator of Augusto Pinochet's dictatorship.

He is emeritus professor of the Pontifical Catholic University of Chile.

References

External Links
 BCN Profile

1918 births
2018 deaths
20th-century Chilean politicians
Pontifical Catholic University of Chile alumni
National Falange politicians
Christian Democratic Party (Chile) politicians
Members of the Social Christian Movement (Chile)
Members of the National Labour Front (Chile)
National Renewal (Chile) politicians
Chilean anti-communists
Politicians from Santiago
Heads of universities in Chile